Titus Dixon born June 15, 1966, is a former professional National Football League (NFL), Canadian Football League (CFL), and Arena Football League (AFL) player. 

Titus Dixon was born in Clewiston, Florida. Titus Dixon spent his collegiate years at Troy State University in Troy, Alabama where he currently holds several records for both football and track and field. Titus Dixon also spent time in the US Olympics tryouts for track and field. Titus Dixon was drafted by the New York Jets in 1989. After spending 12 or so seasons playing professional football Titus spent time doing something he has always dreamed of which is teaching. While at Troy State University Titus majored in Criminal Justice and Business. After his tenure in Professional Football he went on to be a Deputy and Teacher in Florida. He now spends his time Teaching Criminal Justice and coaching Football, Track and Field and Cross Country. Titus also spends a lot of his time volunteering with youth for track and field and football. He has three children (Tiquesta, Titus and Tyree), two grand children (Paige and Peyton) and is married to Melinda Clark.

References

1966 births
Living people
American football wide receivers
American players of Canadian football
Buffalo Destroyers players
Canadian football wide receivers
Indianapolis Colts players
New York Jets players
People from Clewiston, Florida
Players of American football from Florida
San Antonio Riders players
San Jose SaberCats players
Sacramento Gold Miners players
Troy Trojans football players